Le Communiste ('The Communist') was a French language weekly newspaper published from Brussels, Belgium. It was founded in 1928 by the group of War Van Overstraeten, which had been expelled from the Communist Party of Belgium.

References

1928 establishments in Belgium
Communism in Belgium
Communist newspapers
Defunct newspapers published in Belgium
French-language communist newspapers
French-language newspapers published in Belgium
Newspapers published in Brussels
Publications established in 1928
Publications with year of disestablishment missing